Proteinuria is the presence of excess proteins in the urine. In healthy persons, urine contains very little protein; an excess is suggestive of illness. Excess protein in the urine often causes the urine to become foamy (although this symptom may also be caused by other conditions). Severe proteinuria can cause nephrotic syndrome in which there is worsening swelling of the body.

Signs and symptoms
Proteinuria often causes no symptoms and it may only be discovered incidentally.

Foamy urine is considered a cardinal sign of proteinuria, but only a third of people with foamy urine have proteinuria as the underlying cause. It may also be caused by bilirubin in the urine (bilirubinuria), retrograde ejaculation, pneumaturia (air bubbles in the urine) due to a fistula, or drugs such as pyridium.

Causes 
There are three main mechanisms to cause proteinuria:
 Due to disease in the glomerulus
 Because of increased quantity of proteins in serum  (overflow proteinuria)
 Due to low reabsorption at proximal tubule (Fanconi syndrome)

Proteinuria can also be caused by certain biological agents, such as bevacizumab (Avastin) used in cancer treatment.  Excessive fluid intake (drinking in excess of 4 litres of water per day) is another cause.

Proteinuria may be a sign of renal (kidney) damage.  Since serum proteins are readily reabsorbed from urine, the presence of excess protein indicates either an insufficiency of absorption or impaired filtration. People with diabetes may have damaged nephrons and develop proteinuria.  The most common cause of proteinuria is diabetes, and in any person with proteinuria and diabetes, the cause of the underlying proteinuria should be separated into two categories: diabetic proteinuria versus the field.

With severe proteinuria, general hypoproteinemia can develop which results in
diminished oncotic pressure.  Symptoms of diminished oncotic pressure may include ascites, edema and hydrothorax.

Conditions with proteinuria

Proteinuria may be a feature of the following conditions:
 Nephrotic syndromes (i.e. intrinsic kidney failure)
 Pre-eclampsia
 Eclampsia
 Toxic lesions of kidneys
 Amyloidosis
 Collagen vascular diseases (e.g. systemic lupus erythematosus)
 Dehydration
 Glomerular diseases, such as membranous glomerulonephritis, focal segmental glomerulonephritis, minimal change disease (lipoid nephrosis)
 Strenuous exercise
 Stress
 Benign orthostatic (postural) proteinuria
 Focal segmental glomerulosclerosis (FSGS)
 IgA nephropathy (i.e. Berger's disease)
 IgM nephropathy
 Membranoproliferative glomerulonephritis
 Membranous nephropathy
 Minimal change disease
 Sarcoidosis
 Alport syndrome
 Diabetes mellitus (diabetic nephropathy)
 Drugs (e.g. NSAIDs, nicotine, penicillamine, lithium carbonate, gold and other heavy metals, ACE inhibitors, antibiotics, or opiates (especially heroin)
 Fabry disease
 Infections (e.g. HIV, syphilis, hepatitis, poststreptococcal infection, urinary schistosomiasis)
 Aminoaciduria
 Fanconi syndrome in association with Wilson disease
 Hypertensive nephrosclerosis
 Interstitial nephritis
 Sickle cell disease
 Hemoglobinuria
 Multiple myeloma
 Myoglobinuria
 Organ rejection:
 Ebola virus disease
 Nail–patella syndrome
 Familial Mediterranean fever
 HELLP syndrome
 Systemic lupus erythematosus
 Granulomatosis with polyangiitis
 Rheumatoid arthritis
 Glycogen storage disease type 1
 Goodpasture syndrome
 Henoch–Schönlein purpura
 A urinary tract infection which has spread to the kidney(s)
 Sjögren syndrome
 Post-infectious glomerulonephritis
 Living kidney donor
 Polycystic kidney disease

Bence–Jones proteinuria
 Amyloidosis
 Pre-malignant plasma cell dyscrasias:
 Monoclonal gammopathy of undetermined significance
 Smoldering multiple myeloma
 Malignant plasma cell dyscrasias
 Multiple myeloma
 Waldenström's macroglobulinemia
 Other malignancies
 Chronic lymphocytic leukemia
 Rare cases of other Lymphoid leukemias
 Rare cases of Lymphomas

Pathophysiology

Protein is the building block of all living organisms. When kidneys are functioning properly by filtering the blood, they distinguish the proteins from the wastes which were previously present together in the blood. Thereafter, kidneys retain or reabsorb the filtered proteins and return them to the circulating blood while removing wastes by excreting them in the urine. Whenever the kidney is compromised, their ability to filter the blood by differentiating protein from the waste, or retaining the filtered protein then returning which back to the body, is damaged. As a result, there is a significant amount of protein to be discharged along with waste in the urine that makes the concentration of proteins in urine high enough to be detected by medical machine.

Medical testing equipment has improved over time, and as a result tests are better able to detect smaller quantities of protein. Protein in urine is considered normal as long as the value remains within the normal reference range. Variation exists between healthy patients, and it is generally considered harmless for the kidney to fail to retain a few proteins in the blood, letting those protein discharge from the body through urine.

Albumin and immunoglobins

Albumin is a protein produced by the liver which makes up roughly 50%-60% of the proteins in the blood while the other 40%-50% are proteins other than albumin, such as immunoglobins. This is why the concentration of albumin in the urine is one of the single sensitive indicators of kidney disease, particularly for those with diabetes or hypertension, compared to routine proteinuria examination.

As the loss of proteins from the body progresses, the suffering will gradually become symptomatic.

The exception applies to the scenario when there's an overproduction of proteins in the body, in which the kidney is not to blame.

Diagnosis

Conventionally, proteinuria is diagnosed by a simple dipstick test, although it is possible for the test to give a false negative reading, even with nephrotic range proteinuria if the urine is dilute. False negatives may also occur if the protein in the urine is composed mainly of globulins or Bence Jones proteins because the reagent on the test strips, bromophenol blue, is highly specific for albumin. Traditionally, dipstick protein tests would be quantified by measuring the total quantity of protein in a 24-hour urine collection test, and abnormal globulins by specific requests for protein electrophoresis. Trace results may be produced in response to excretion of Tamm–Horsfall mucoprotein.

More recently developed technology detects human serum albumin (HSA) through the use of liquid crystals (LCs). The presence of HSA molecules disrupts the LCs supported on the AHSA-decorated slides thereby producing bright optical signals which are easily distinguishable. Using this assay, concentrations of HSA as low as 15 µg/mL can be detected.

Alternatively, the concentration of protein in the urine may be compared to the creatinine level in a spot urine sample. This is termed the protein/creatinine ratio. The 2005 UK Chronic Kidney Disease guidelines state that protein/creatinine ratio is a better test than 24-hour urinary protein measurement. Proteinuria is defined as a protein/creatinine ratio greater than 45 mg/mmol (which is equivalent to albumin/creatinine ratio of greater than 30 mg/mmol or approximately 300 mg/g) with very high levels of proteinuria having a ratio greater than 100 mg/mmol.

Protein dipstick measurements should not be confused with the amount of protein detected on a test for microalbuminuria which denotes values for protein for urine in mg/day versus urine protein dipstick values which denote values for protein in mg/dL. That is, there is a basal level of proteinuria that can occur below 30 mg/day which is considered non-pathology. Values between 30 and 300 mg/day are termed microalbuminuria which is considered pathologic. Urine protein lab values for microalbumin of >30 mg/day correspond to a detection level within the "trace" to "1+" range of a urine dipstick protein assay.  Therefore, positive indication of any protein detected on a urine dipstick assay obviates any need to perform a urine microalbumin test as the upper limit for microalbuminuria has already been exceeded.

Analysis
It is possible to analyze urine samples in determining albumin, hemoglobin and myoglobin with an optimized MEKC method.

Treatment
Treating proteinuria mainly needs proper diagnosis of the cause.
The most common cause is diabetic nephropathy; in this case, proper glycemic control may slow the progression. Medical management consists of angiotensin converting enzyme (ACE) inhibitors, which are typically first-line therapy for proteinuria.  In patients whose proteinuria is not controlled with ACE inhibitors, the addition of an aldosterone antagonist (i.e., spironolactone) or angiotensin receptor blocker (ARB) may further reduce protein loss.  Caution must be used if these agents are added to ACE inhibitor therapy due to the risk of hyperkalemia.
Proteinuria secondary to autoimmune disease should be treated with steroids or steroid-sparing agent plus the use of ACE inhibitors.

See also
 Albuminuria
 Microalbuminuria
 List of terms associated with diabetes
 Protein toxicity
 Major urinary proteins
 UPCR

References

External links

Abnormal clinical and laboratory findings for urine